Lana Eleanor Cantrell AM (born 7 August 1943) is an Australian-American singer and entertainment lawyer. She was nominated for the Grammy Award for Best New Artist in the Grammy Awards of 1968.

Music career
Cantrell recorded six albums for RCA Victor during the 1960s. Her preferred style of music was pop standards, but she later made contemporary pop rock a significant part of her performances. Cantrell commented in a 1994 profile, "Think of how few people can still make their careers by singing standards.... There's Tony Bennett and Barbra Streisand, and I don't know anyone else."

Cantrell was a frequent guest on television shows including The Ed Sullivan Show, The Tonight Show Starring Johnny Carson, and The Mike Douglas Show. However, she never had a top 40 hit in the Billboard Hot 100, hitting #63 in 1975 with "Like a Sunday Morning".

Transition to law career
Cantrell eventually decided to make a transition out of music in the 1980s due to a decline in the number of venues where she could sing in her preferred style, the size of her audiences, and her working conditions. Although she had once been able to tour at supper clubs that would furnish a 20-piece orchestra for her and her conductor, in later years she toured with only a five-piece band that she had to pay herself. She decided to pursue a law career in part because a former manager had spent much of her earnings over the years and she wanted to protect other performers from similar experiences.

In 1986, Cantrell enrolled at Marymount Manhattan College, where she majored in history. After receiving her bachelor's degree, she attended Fordham University School of Law. After graduation, she began practicing law with the firm of Ballon Stoll Bader & Nadler in New York City.

In 2019, Cantrell's license to practice law in the state of New York was suspended due to an undisclosed medical condition.  Before having her license suspended, she operated a private practice in Mattituck, NY.

Honours and awards
In 1966, Cantrell won the Amber Nightingale award for singing at a festival in Sopot, Poland.

In 2003, Cantrell was named a member of the Order of Australia. The honour was conferred for "service to the entertainment industry, and for assistance to the Australian community in New York."

Personal life
It was reported in 1973 that Cantrell was engaged to Australian television personality Graham Kennedy. This turned out to be a hoax. Kennedy later claimed that his romance with Cantrell was purely an invention of the Sunday Observer, although Kennedy himself had confirmed publicly at the time that the relationship was real.
Judy Carne, of Rowan & Martin's Laugh-In claimed she had a love affair with Cantrell.

Discography

Albums
And Then There Was Lana, RCA Victor LSP-3755, 1967
Another Shade of Lana, RCA Victor LSP-3862, 1967
Act III, RCA Victor LSP-3947, 1968
Lana!, RCA Victor LSP-4026, 1968
The Now of Then, RCA Victor LSP-4121, 1969
The 6th of Lana, RCA Victor LSP-4263, 1969
 The Best of Lana Cantrell, RCA ANL1-1049, 1975

Eps
Introducing Lana Cantrell, REX, 1961
Australia’s Great Talent, FESTIVAL FX-11,327, ????

Reissues

Beginning in 2017, Lana Cantrell's RCA Victor albums have been reissued for the first time on compact disc in Hi-Res audio, replacing years of poor quality bootlegs on YouTube. Her six studio albums have been reissued from 2017 to 2019. All reissues were published by the RCA-Legacy label. Singles or B-sides that did not  appear on her albums are not available at the moment.

References

External links

1943 births
Living people
Members of the Order of Australia
New York (state) lawyers
Australian women pop singers
20th-century Australian women singers